Below is a list of rimfire cartridges, ordered by caliber, small to large. Rimfire ammunition is a type of metallic cartridge whose primer is located within a hollow circumferential rim protruding from the base of its casing.

Among the most common rimfire cartridges are .22 caliber and .17 caliber. The bullet diameter for the ubiquitous .22 Long Rifle is .222 inch (5.64 mm) while .17 caliber firearms, both rimfire and centerfire, generally measure .172 inch (4.37 mm).

List

2.34mm
.14 Alton Jones
.17 Hornady Mach 2 (.17 HM2)
.17 Hornady Magnum Rimfire (.17 HMR)
.17 PMC/Aguila
.17 Winchester Super Magnum
5 mm Remington Rimfire Magnum
.22 Short
.22 Long
.22 Extra Long
.22 Long Rifle
.22 Winchester Magnum Rimfire (.22 WMR)
.22 Winchester Rimfire (.22 WRF)
.22 ILARCO (.22 American)
.22 CB
.22 BB (6mm Flobert)
.22 Remington Automatic
.22 Winchester Automatic
.25 Short (.25 Bacon & Bliss)
.25 Stevens
.25 Stevens Short
.267 Remington
.277 rimfire
.30 rimfire
.310 Remington Skeet
.31 Eley
.32 rimfire
.340 rimfire revolver
.35 Allen
9mm Flobert
.38 rimfire
.41 Short
.41 Swiss
.42 Allen
.44 Short & Long
.440 
.442 Eley
.44 Henry
.45 Danish
.46 rimfire
.50 Remington Navy
.50 Government
14x33mmR Wänzl
.56-46, 56-50, 56-52, .56-56 Spencer
.58 Gatling
.58 Joslyn carbine
.58 Mont Storm
.58 Miller
1" Gatling (one specimen known)

See also
 Snake shot
 Garden gun
 Wildcat cartridge
 Centerfire ammunition

Rimfire cartridges
Pistol and rifle cartridges
rimfire